Anthony Brabazon, 8th Earl of Meath ( – 4 January 1790), styled Lord Brabazon from 1763 to 1772, was an Anglo-Irish peer.

The elder son of Edward Brabazon, 7th Earl of Meath and Martha Collins, he sat for Wicklow County from 1745 to 1760. He then sat for Dublin County from 1761 until he succeeded his father in the peerage in 1772. He died on 4 January 1790 and was succeeded by his eldest surviving son, William.

He was educated at Trinity College, Dublin.
On 20 May 1758, he married Grace Leigh (d. 28 October 1812). Their children included:
 Chaworth Brabazon, Lord Brabazon (18 August 1760 – December 1779)
 William Brabazon, 9th Earl of Meath (1769–1797), killed in a duel
 Lady Catherine Brabazon (c.1770 – 24 December 1847), married Reverend Francis Brownlow (1779–1847)
 John Brabazon, 10th Earl of Meath (1772–1851), succeeded his brother

References

1721 births
1790 deaths
Brabazon, Anthony Brabazon, Lord
Brabazon, Anthony Brabazon, Lord
Brabazon, Anthony Brabazon, Lord
Members of the Parliament of Ireland (pre-1801) for County Dublin constituencies
Members of the Parliament of Ireland (pre-1801) for County Wicklow constituencies
Anthony
8
Alumni of Trinity College Dublin